The Auckland rail (Lewinia muelleri) is a small nearly flightless rail endemic to the Auckland Islands 460 km south of New Zealand. It is somewhat of a biogeographical anomaly, being the only species in the genus Lewinia to have reached the islands of New Zealand, skipping over the main islands to reach the remote Auckland group. Its closest relative is Lewin's rail of Australia. The species is currently restricted to two islands in the Auckland group, Adams Island and Disappointment Island.

The Auckland rail is a small rail with chestnut back plumage and a grey breast. The flanks are barred black and white and the head is red-brown, with a red bill. It is smaller than the Australian Lewins' rail. There are conflicting reports about its ability to fly. Early accounts suggested it could; recent researchers have found little evidence for this. If the species is able to fly, it does so very infrequently. Auckland rails have a variety of calls, the most common being a crex call made at one second intervals 10 or more times in a row. The function of the calls is unknown.

Little is known about the reproductive biology of the Auckland rail. The few nests that have been found contained clutches of two eggs, probably laid in early November. The eggs are cream coloured with red, brown and grey spots.

The Auckland rail is highly secretive and was considered to be extinct for many years before its rediscovery. The population of about 1500 birds is currently stable on the two islands it survives on. It is thought to have become extinct on the main Auckland Islands due to the presence of introduced feral cats and pigs; it is hoped the eventual removal of these from the islands will allow for reintroductions to other islands in the group. The species is currently considered vulnerable by the IUCN and BirdLife International due to the possibility of rats or other predators reaching the two islands it survives on.

References

BirdLife International (2016) Species factsheet: Lewinia muelleri.

External links
BirdLife Species Factsheet.
Auckland rail discussed in RNZ Critter of the Week, 30 August 2022

Auckland rail
Birds of the Auckland Islands
Auckland rail
Endemic birds of New Zealand